Jet Grind Radio (released as Jet Set Radio in Europe) is a video game for the Game Boy Advance system, which is based on the Dreamcast title of the same name. The game was developed by Vicarious Visions and published by THQ.

Gameplay

Jet Grind Radio is an action platform game based on the Dreamcast version. The gameplay of Jet Set Radio differs in several key areas from its Dreamcast counterpart. Instead of being a 3D game using polygons, the game is a 2D game with an isometric viewpoint. The goal of the game is to traverse through neighborhoods and find key locations to tag them with graffiti under a specific time frame. Players can grind on rails and perform tricks. When a key location is reached, players must tag it with graffiti that may require a single press of a button, or a sequence of buttons that need to be pressed at the correct time. The game offers a graffiti editor to customize and create unique graffiti tags. Players can collect hidden icons scattered throughout in order to expand the number of graffiti tags. After completing the story mode of a specific neighborhood, three new time attack modes are unlocked for that neighborhood. The three modes involve tagging an entire city, racing, and performing tricks. Jet Grind Radio also offers 4-player multiplayer that allows players to compete within the unlocked time attack modes.

Plot

Like in the Dreamcast version, the player assumes the role of one of the GG's, a graffiti gang, led by Beat (who is also the first playable character in all versions apart from Jet Set Radio Future. The Rokkaku group and the Tokyo-to construction conglomerate have teamed up to clamp down on the "Rudies", the game's term for the Graffiti spraying teenagers. The object of the game is to "Tag" certain surroundings with graffiti before the time limit runs out or "before the indomitable array of cops arrive".

Development and release
Jet Grind Radio was developed by Vicarious Visions who previously developed the GBA demakes for Tony Hawk Pro Skater and published by THQ. The game utilizes the same engine and isometric perspective as the Tony Hawk Pro Skater GBA titles. Despite the hardware limitations, cartoony graphics were designed to emulate the look of cel-shaded graphics. The music count was reduced from more than 21 to around 8, and the songs that remained were reduced to 30 to 45-second samples. The levels ranged from exact duplicates to reminiscent counterparts of the original Jet Set Radio. Soundtrack was developed by Shin'en and recreated six tracks from the original game into repeating, 1-minute long songs The game was released in North America on June 26, 2003, and in Europe on February 20, 2004, under the name of the original Dreamcast version, Jet Set Radio.

Reception

Jet Grind Radio was received with positive reception among critics. The game has an aggregated score 74 out of 100 based on 22 reviews. The game was featured in IGNs as a runner up for their "Game of the Month" of June 2003, and was also the runner up for "Best Extreme Sports" category in IGN's 2003 Awards.

When it came to the game's presentation and accuracy to the original Dreamcast version, the game received high praise among critics. GameSpot praised the game for being matching the quality of the console version stating: "Jet Grind Radio is just as enjoyable on the GBA as it was on meatier consoles". GamePro complimented the visual style, stating the environments were beautifully detailed and ripped straight from the original. IGN gave a more lukewarm response, but still praised the game and developers for attempting to stay as faithful to the original. GameZone gave a similar response, stating that the game doesn't deserve as much praise as the original game, but still thought the game was unique enough to stand out against other Game Boy Advance titles. Edge magazine, in contrast, was more critical and preferred the game sacrifice more authenticity in favor of utility. Game Informer praised it for staying true to the game design and retaining the gameplay and levels of its predecessors. Game Informer also had criticisms regarding the control-scheme of maneuvering the character in the isometric perspective, concluding: "All told, this GBA edition is done well enough that fans of the series will be satisfied with the on-the-go experience, but don't expect to be blown away".

References

External links
 Vicarious Visions official page (archived)
 THQ official page (archived)

2003 video games
Action video games
Game Boy Advance games
Game Boy Advance-only games
Graffiti video games
Platform games
Sega video games
Single-player video games
THQ games
Vicarious Visions games
Video games developed in Japan
Video games developed in the United States
Video games with isometric graphics